The 2002 FIA Sportscar Championship Dijon was the fifth race for the 2002 FIA Sportscar Championship season held at Dijon-Prenois, France.  It took place on August 18, 2002.

Official results
Class winners in bold.  Cars failing to complete 75% of winner's distance marked as Not Classified (NC).

Statistics
 Pole Position - #8 Racing For Holland - 1:10.901
 Fastest Lap - #8 Racing For Holland - 1:11.614
 Distance - 448.400 km
 Average Speed - 179.232 km/h

External links
 Race results

D
FIA Sportscar
FIA Sportscar Championship Dijon